Thomas Whitemarsh (? - 1733), sometimes spelled as Whitmarsh,  was a printer who printed and introduced the first newspaper to the colony of South Carolina on January 8, 1731, called, the South Carolina Gazette. Little is known of Whitemarsh's adolescent life in England. Whitemarsh was a journeyman under Benjamin Franklin, who had, after establishing a partnership with him, sent Whitemarsh to Charlestown in response to a call by the colonial assembly for a printer who was offering £1000 for the effort. Whitemarsh arrived there on September 29, 1730. Franklin had known Whitemarsh while the latter was working in a print shop in London as a compositor  and came to Philadelphia and worked for Franklin. The first printing of Whitemarsh's Gazette was issued on January 8, 1732. Whiemarsh died of yellow fever in the summer of 1733 only a couple of years after he had printed the first issue of the Gazette. The South Carolina Gazette was taken over by Louis Timothee who became its proprietor and editor.

Whitemarsh's purchases of printing supplies, books and almanacs were recorded in Franklin's Ledgers A and B (above, p. 172);

Citations

Bibliography

 
 
 
 
 
 
 
 

American printers
Apprentices of Benjamin Franklin